This is a list of places on the Victorian Heritage Register in the City of Wyndham in Victoria, Australia. The Victorian Heritage Register is maintained by the Heritage Council of Victoria.

The Victorian Heritage Register, as of 2020, lists the following 13 state-registered places within the City of Wyndham:

References

Wyndham
City of Wyndham